Jane Karla Rodrigues Gögel (born 6 July 1975) is a Brazilian archer and former para table tennis player who competed in four Paralympic Games from 2008 to 2020. She started her career in 2003.

Starting in table tennis 
Gogel started her career in 2003 when she was invited to try different sports. She loved table tennis and so started to practise. When she got better she started winning national tournaments and participating at international tournaments. At the Parapan Championships in 2005 she won her first medals and qualified for the World Championships 2006.

Competing on high-level

See also 
Archery at the 2016 Summer Paralympics – Team compound open

References

External links 
Jane Karla Gogel at Rio2016.com

1975 births
Living people
Table tennis players at the 2008 Summer Paralympics
Table tennis players at the 2012 Summer Paralympics
Archers at the 2016 Summer Paralympics
Brazilian female archers
Paralympic table tennis players of Brazil
Medalists at the 2007 Parapan American Games
Medalists at the 2011 Parapan American Games
Brazilian female table tennis players
21st-century Brazilian women